Henry Charles Gillo (October 5, 1894 – September 6, 1948) was a professional football player for the Hammond Pros, Racine Legion, and the Milwaukee Badgers from 1920 to 1926. In 1920, Gillo also served as head coach of the Pros. He played at the collegiate level at Colgate University. His style of play earned him the nickname Hank 'Line Plunging' Gillo.

Biography
Gillo was born Henry Charles Gillo on October 5, 1894 in Milwaukee, Wisconsin. Gillo played at Colgate from 1915–1917, and 1919. He was voted captain for the 1918 team but was serving in France in World War I (there was no football at Colgate in 1918). After his collegiate career he led the NFL in scoring in 1922 with 52 points. In 1923 he was a Collyer's First-team All-Pro. He held the NFL record for longest field goal with a 55, 56, or 57 yard kick against the Packers in 1922.  When he returned to Milwaukee he married Eva Shead, his high school girlfriend. He spent 21 years as a teacher in a prep school in Milwaukee and was the head of the biology department at the time of his death. Gillo died of a heart attack on September 6, 1948.

References

1894 births
1948 deaths
Colgate Raiders football players
Hammond Pros players
Milwaukee Badgers players
Racine Legion players
Sportspeople from Milwaukee
Players of American football from Milwaukee
Hammond Pros coaches
United States Army personnel of World War I